James Austin Dillard (December 21, 1938 – July 19, 2022) was an American football halfback who played for the Calgary Stampeders, Ottawa Rough Riders and Toronto Argonauts of the Canadian Football League (CFL). He played college football at Oklahoma State University–Stillwater and also had stints with the Baltimore Colts and Minnesota Vikings in the National Football League (NFL).

Early life and education
Dillard was born on December 21, 1938, in Pawhuska, Oklahoma, to Austin and Eunice Dillard. He attended high school in Fairfax, where he participated in football and track and was given the nickname "Fairfax Freighter". In football, he was named team most valuable player, most outstanding back in the conference, All-American, and all-state.

Dillard was given a full scholarship to Oklahoma State University–Stillwater after graduating from high school. He accepted the offer and played football on the freshman team in 1958. In a 1958 game against the Oklahoma freshmen, Dillard scored a touchdown on a 97-yard run. He played his first season on the varsity team in 1959. On offense he played as a backup to senior Vernon Sewell, and on defense he excelled at defensive back. By week four of the season, Dillard had 220 rushing yards and a 6.7 average per-carry, placing him second on the team behind Sewell (who had 222).

Dillard's coach Cliff Speegle said:

Dillard ended the 1959 season as the team's leading rusher. In a game against Tulsa that year, he scored on a 91-yard touchdown run, which remains the fourth-longest run in school history. He became the starting running back in 1960 and led the team again in rushing yards with 647 on 154 attempts, placing eighth in the conference. He was named one of the three team captains for his senior season, 1961.

Described as one of Oklahoma State's "all-time greats", Dillard is one of only eight players to have led the team in rushing three consecutive seasons and was named to their 1950s all-decade team. He finished with 1,840 rushing yards on 392 attempts, a 4.69 average per-carry.

Professional career
Dillard was selected both in the NFL Draft (by the Baltimore Colts, 51st overall) and AFL Draft (by the Oakland Raiders, 65th overall), but declined both offers to play in the CFL for the Calgary Stampeders. "They paid more money than American teams then", Dillard later said. "A lot of Americans went up there. They also got you a job." In his first preseason game with the team, Dillard scored three touchdowns and helped Calgary win 30–28 over the Montreal Alouettes. He made his CFL debut in week one, a 6–17 loss to the Saskatchewan Roughriders. He came to the team "highly recommended and proved why" in week two against the Winnipeg Blue Bombers, according to the Times Colonist, rushing for 114 yards and scoring two touchdowns. He played in all 16 games in his first season of professional football, and finished with 92 rush attempts for 480 yards and 38 receptions for 733 yards, scoring a total of nine touchdowns.

In , Dillard shared the starting running back position with Lovell Coleman and appeared in 15 games, making 108 rushing attempts for 690 yards, and 34 receptions for 543 yards, scoring 13 touchdowns. He placed second in touchdowns scored, only behind Coleman, and helped the team compile a 10–4–2 record.

The following season, Dillard only saw action in five games, making 30 rushes for 179 yards and 16 receptions for 224 yards, scoring three touchdowns as the Stampeders finished with a record of 12–4. In , just before the regular season began, Dillard was traded to the Ottawa Rough Riders for two players. He was named an all-star selection in his first season with Ottawa, after recording 130 rushes for 756 yards in just 12 games. He appeared in 14 games the following season and ran for 627 yards, scoring seven touchdowns. He helped the team make it to the Grey Cup that year, where they lost to the Saskatchewan Roughriders 14–29.

He was their top running back and led the team with 670 rushing yards on 124 carries. He also scored a team-leading nine touchdowns on his way to a third all-star selection.

In , Dillard signed with the Baltimore Colts in the NFL, who had drafted him seven years prior. He was traded to the Minnesota Vikings in July, but did not make their final roster.

Dillard finished his CFL career with 733 rushes for 3,949 yards and 28 touchdowns.

Later life
In 1971, Dillard moved to Tulsa, Oklahoma, where he became a teacher and coach in football, swimming, and track. He also served as an assistant coach for the Tulsa Knights from 1974 to 1975. He moved to Cleveland, Oklahoma, in December 1975, and became an insurance agent at State Farm. He retired in 2017.

In 2005, Dillard was inducted into the Oil Bowl Hall of Fame.

His son J. R. Dillard played for Oklahoma State and in the CFL, and his grandson Clint Dillard also played at Oklahoma State.

Dillard died on July 19, 2022, at his home in Cleveland, at age 83.

References

1938 births
2022 deaths
People from Pawhuska, Oklahoma
American football running backs
American players of Canadian football
Calgary Stampeders players
Canadian football running backs
Oklahoma State Cowboys football players
Ottawa Rough Riders players
Players of American football from Oklahoma
Toronto Argonauts players